The Star Wars franchise has spawned multiple films and television series. Two animated series were released in the mid-1980s. Further animated series began to be released in the 2000s, the first two of which focused on the prequel trilogy-era Clone Wars. After Disney's acquisition of Lucasfilm, only The Clone Wars was kept in the canon of continuity of the episodic Star Wars films. Two additional half-hour animated series were created: Rebels, which ties into the original trilogy, and Resistance, which ties into the sequel trilogy. An additional series spun off from The Clone Wars, titled The Bad Batch, debuted on Disney+ in 2021. Two animated anthology series have been produced: Visions in 2021 and Tales of the Jedi in 2022. The first young audience animated series, Young Jedi Adventures set during the High Republic era, will be released in May 2023.

The first live-action series in the franchise, The Mandalorian, premiered on Disney+ in November 2019 and spawned two spin-offs set in the same timeline, The Book of Boba Fett and Ahsoka, as well as another set around the same era, Skeleton Crew. Additional live-action series include Obi-Wan Kenobi, Andor, The Acolyte, and Lando.

Animated series

Droids and Ewoks (1985–1986) 

One reviewer calls Droids "rudimentary" and Ewoks "unremarkable", but writes that both "marked the first major effort to expand the Star Wars 'brand' beyond its original live-action film existence."

The Clone Wars (2008–2020)

George Lucas created his own animation company, Lucasfilm Animation, and used it to produce his first in-house Star Wars CGI-animated series, using Cartoon Network's 2003 Clone Wars micro-series as a "pilot". The Clone Wars (2008–2020) was introduced through a 2008 animated film of the same name. The series is set between Attack of the Clones and Revenge of the Sith of the prequel trilogy. It focuses mainly on the Jedi characters of Anakin Skywalker and Obi-Wan Kenobi, as well as Anakin's Padawan apprentice, Ahsoka Tano (an original character created by Filoni for the series), with other characters from the live-action films in supporting roles. The series marked the beginning of Dave Filoni's involvement in Star Wars animation projects.

After Disney's acquisition of the Star Wars franchise, The Clone Wars was cancelled in 2014 before its intended final episodes were completed. The remaining unaired episodes were released on Netflix as "The Lost Missions". The chronological storyline order was released after the series had initially finished airing. The film and series were included in the canon established in 2014. The show was later revived for an additional final season that premiered on February 21, 2020, on the streaming service Disney+.

Rebels (2014–2018)

In 2014, Disney XD began airing Star Wars Rebels, the first CGI-animated series produced following the Disney acquisition. It follows a band of rebels as they fight the Galactic Empire in the years leading up to A New Hope. It closed some of the arcs introduced in The Clone Wars. Due to the film Rogue One being produced at the same time, the film and the series acknowledged each other. The series also included an in-canon version of Grand Admiral Thrawn from the Legends  Thrawn trilogy.

Resistance (2018–2020)

The animated series Star Wars Resistance debuted in late 2018, shifting the animation style towards anime-inspired cel-shading visuals, and focuses on a young Resistance pilot Kazuda Xiono before and during The Force Awakens and The Last Jedi, leading up to The Rise of Skywalker. Sequel trilogy characters such as Captain Phasma, General Hux, and Kylo Ren appear. The second and final season premiered on October 6, 2019.

The Bad Batch (2021–present) 

Set after the events of The Clone Wars, The Bad Batch follows the titular squad making their way through the galaxy as mercenaries in the early days of the Empire. The series was announced in July 2020, and premiered on Disney+ on May 4, 2021. Dave Filoni, Athena Portillo, Brad Rau, and Jennifer Corbett serve as executive producers, with Carrie Beck as co-executive producer and Josh Rimes as producer. Rau also serves as supervising director with Corbett the head writer. The second season debuted on January 4, 2023, and consists of 16 episodes, concluding on March 29, 2023.

Visions (2021–present) 

Announced on December 10, 2020, Visions is an anthology anime series of nine short films by different creators, set in the Star Wars universe but not restricted to the canonical timeline. It released on Disney+ on September 22, 2021. Footage from the project was first revealed at Anime Expo on July 3. The anthology featured short films produced by Kamikaze Douga, Geno Studio, Studio Colorido, Studio Trigger, Kinema Citrus, Science SARU, and Production I.G. A second volume of shorts from animation studios based in Japan, Chile, the United Kingdom, France, South Africa, South Korea, India, Ireland, and Spain, as well as Lucasfilm, will be released on May 4, 2023.

Tales of the Jedi (2022) 

In April 2022, an animated anthology series titled Tales of the Jedi was revealed to be in development, with Filoni involved. The series was officially revealed in May 2022 as a six-episode series, with three episodes focusing on Ahsoka Tano throughout her life, and the other three focusing on a young Count Dooku and his padawan Qui-Gon Jinn. It was released on October 26, 2022, on Disney+.

Young Jedi Adventures 

In May 2022, a Young Jedi Adventures animated series was announced at Star Wars Celebration. The series is targeted at young audiences and their families, and is set during the High Republic era, following a group of younglings as they learn the ways of the Force, including compassion, self-discipline, team work and patience, to become Jedi Knights. The series will be released in full on April 26, 2023, on Disney+ and on Disney Junior.

Animated micro-series and shorts

Clone Wars (2003–2005)

After the release of Attack of the Clones, developed and drawn by Genndy Tartakovsky. Cartoon Network produced and aired the micro-series Clone Wars from 2003 to weeks before the 2005 release of Revenge of the Sith, as the series featured events set between those films. 

The plot in the series was intended as prequel to then upcoming Revenge of The Sith and directly leads to the starting point in the movie.

It won the Primetime Emmy Awards for Outstanding Animated Program in 2004 and 2005.

Blips (2017)
Star Wars Blips is an animated micro-series created to promote The Last Jedi. It features droids such as BB-8 and R2-D2, in addition to porgs.

Forces of Destiny (2017–2018)

The animated micro-series Star Wars Forces of Destiny debuted in 2017; it focuses on the female characters of the franchise and is set in various eras.

Galaxy of Adventures (2018–2020)
Star Wars Galaxy of Adventures debuted on the "Star Wars Kids" YouTube channel and website in late 2018. Using stylized animation, the series of shorts reimagine key scenes from the saga, initially leading up the release of The Rise of Skywalker. The shorts feature audio from the original films (with narration by Dante Basco) and are animated by Titmouse, Inc.The score is composed by Ryan Shore.

Roll Out (2019–2020)
Star Wars Roll Out debuted on the Star Wars Kids YouTube channel and website in August 2019. The shorts depict the main characters from the franchise as ball-shaped, similar to BB-8, and utilize a kid-friendly cutout animation style. io9 calls the design of the series "adorable".

Galaxy of Creatures (2021–2023) 
Star Wars Galaxy of Creatures debuted on the Star Wars Kids YouTube channel and website in October 2021. The shorts depict the droid SF-R3 ("Aree") as he journeys across the galaxy learning about various wildlife.

Galactic Pals (2022) 
Star Wars Galactic Pals is an animated micro-series that premiered on April 12, 2022, on StarWarsKids.com and YouTube. A spinoff of the adventures of the droid SF-R3 ("Aree") in Star Wars Galaxy of Creatures, Galactic Pals joins M1-RE ("Miree"), another member of the Galactic Society of Creature Enthusiasts, as she looks after and studies ornery Ortolans, fussy Hutts, scavenging Jawas, and more creatures and aliens aboard the Youngling Care Space Station.

"Zen – Grogu and Dust Bunnies" (2022) 
"Zen – Grogu and Dust Bunnies" is a hand-drawn animated short by Studio Ghibli that featured Grogu and "dust bunnies". It was released on Disney+ on November 12, 2022.

Live-action series
All of the released and announced live-action series are being released on Disney+.

The Mandalorian (2019–present)

In March 2018, Jon Favreau was hired to write and produce a live-action Star Wars series for Disney+. The series follows "a lone gunfighter in the outer reaches of the galaxy far from the authority of the New Republic" a few years after the events of Return of the Jedi. In August 2018, it was reported that the series would cost about "$100 million for 10 episodes". Pedro Pascal stars as the titular character, and is joined by supporting actors Gina Carano, Nick Nolte, Giancarlo Esposito, Emily Swallow, Carl Weathers, Omid Abtahi, and Werner Herzog. The series premiered on November 12, 2019, with the launch of Disney+. The second season premiered on October 30, 2020, while the third season premiered on March 1, 2023. The fourth season is in development.

The Book of Boba Fett (2021–22) 

In November 2020, Deadline Hollywood reported that a miniseries focused on Boba Fett could begin filming before the end of the year, before a third season of The Mandalorian went into production. The series, known as The Book of Boba Fett, was revealed the following month, and confirmed to be in production ahead of The Mandalorian season three. Favreau and Filoni executive produce along with Robert Rodriguez, with Temuera Morrison and Ming-Na Wen reprising their roles as Boba Fett and Fennec Shand, respectively. It premiered on December 29, 2021, and consisted of seven episodes.

Obi-Wan Kenobi (2022)

In August 2019, it was reported that a series focused on Obi-Wan Kenobi was in development, with Ewan McGregor in talks to reprise his role from the prequel trilogy. The series was initially thought to have been developing as a standalone film, which was ultimately scrapped due to the performance of Solo at the box office. During the 2019 D23 Expo, Lucasfilm officially announced that the series was in development, with McGregor confirmed to reprise his role as the titular character. It will take place ten years after Revenge of the Sith, thus exploring the time during Kenobi's exile prior to the events of A New Hope. In September 2019, Deborah Chow and Hossein Amini were announced as the series' director and writer, respectively, who will also serve as executive producers alongside McGregor. In April 2020, it was announced that Joby Harold would officially be taking over writing duties from Amini. In August 2020, Kathleen Kennedy told TheWrap that it would be a limited series. Filming had begun by May 2021.

On Disney Investor Day 2020, it was revealed that Hayden Christensen would reprise his role as Darth Vader, and that the series would be titled Obi-Wan Kenobi. The series premiered on May 27, 2022, with its first two episodes, and consisted of six episodes, airing the remaining four weekly on Wednesdays until June 22.

Andor (2022–present)

The series follows rebel spy Cassian Andor, five years before the events of Rogue One during the formative years of the Rebellion.

In November 2018, a prequel series to the 2016 film Rogue One centered on Andor was confirmed to be in development, described as a "rousing spy thriller" with Diego Luna reprising his role for the series. Stephen Schiff was hired to serve as showrunner and executive producer of the series, which was developed by Jared Bush, who wrote a series bible and a draft of the pilot episode. In April 2020, Tony Gilroy, who worked on the reshoots of Rogue One, replaced Schiff as showrunner. Gilroy was going to write and direct the pilot, and direct other episodes as well. It was also revealed in April 2020 that Stellan Skarsgård, Kyle Soller, and Denise Gough had joined the cast in undisclosed roles, along with Genevieve O'Reilly reprising her role of Mon Mothma. In September 2020, it was announced that Gilroy would step down from his directing duties in light of the COVID-19 pandemic and would be replaced by Toby Haynes, who was set to direct the first three episodes. Filming began in late November 2020 in London. Andor premiered on September 21, 2022, and the first season consisted of 12 episodes. A second and final season is in development, with Gilroy expecting it to release in late 2024.

Ahsoka 

In December 2020, Ahsoka was announced. Developed by Favreau and Filoni, with Filoni serving as its writer and showrrunner, it exists alongside The Mandalorian and The Book of Boba Fett through a crossover event. Rosario Dawson headlines the limited series, reprising her role as Ahsoka Tano. In October 2021, The Hollywood Reporter announced that Hayden Christensen would reprise his role as Anakin Skywalker in the series, which was set to begin filming in early 2022. In November, Deadline Hollywood announced that Natasha Liu Bordizzo was cast as Sabine Wren, a character first introduced in Rebels. In January  2022, The Hollywood Reporter announced that Mary Elizabeth Winstead had been cast in an undisclosed role. The next month, The Hollywood Reporter announced that Ray Stevenson was cast in an undisclosed role. Filming began in May 2022. Ahsoka is scheduled to be released in mid-to-late 2023.

Skeleton Crew 

In February 2022, Production Weekly revealed the existence of an upcoming, untitled Star Wars series that was using the working title Grammar Rodeo. It was later reported that Jon Watts was being considered to direct at least one episode of the series, along with Favreau as an executive producer.  Casting was set to include four teenage actors and one 30-to-40-year old actor as its series regulars. Filming was set to begin as early as June 2022 and last until December 2022 at Manhattan Beach Studios, with a formal announcement planned for the series at Star Wars Celebration in May 2022. In mid-May 2022, it was further revealed that the series was being created and written by Christopher Ford, who would also executive produce with Watts. The series would be set after the events of Return of the Jedi (1983) and was being described as a "galactic version of classic Amblin coming-of-age adventure films of the '80s". At Star Wars Celebration it was revealed that the series was titled Skeleton Crew and that it would star Jude Law. Filming had been happening for a "few weeks" by early September 2022. It is set to be released in 2023.

The Acolyte 

In April 2020, Variety reported that a female-centric live-action Star Wars series is in development for Disney+ with Russian Doll co-creator Leslye Headland serving as a writer and showrunner. In early November, Headland expounded that the series would be set "in a pocket of the universe and a pocket of the timeline that we don't know much about," elaborating that she was more engaged creatively with the geography of the Star Wars universe than its existing visuals. On November 5, Deadline reported that the series was expected to be an "action thriller with martial arts elements". On Disney Investor Day 2020, it was revealed that the series would be titled The Acolyte and take place during the late High Republic era. In , it was reported that the series would consist of eight episodes. In May 2022, Headland said the series would be a "mystery thriller" set about 100 years before The Phantom Menace, that writing was almost complete, and that the series was casting; In 2022, Amandla Stenberg, Lee Jung-jae, and Manny Jacinto were confirmed to be playing major roles. The eight-episode series will be released on Disney+ in 2024.

Lando 
In December 2020, Lando was announced as a Disney+ limited series focusing on the titular character, with a story by Justin Simien. In May 2022, Kennedy stated the series was still in development, and that they were having discussions with Donald Glover about reprising the role from Solo: A Star Wars Story (2018) in the series.

Game show

Jedi Temple Challenge (2020) 
Star Wars: Jedi Temple Challenge is a web-based children's game show developed by Lucasfilm. First announced in December 2019, the series debuted on the Star Wars Kids website and YouTube channel on June 10, 2020. The series features young contestants competing as Jedi Padawans in a series of obstacle courses and knowledge tests in the attempt to gain the rank of Jedi Knight. The show is hosted by Ahmed Best, who plays the character of Kelleran Beq, the Jedi Master mentor of the contestants who is joined by his droid companions,  (voiced by Mary Holland and performed by Gordon Tarpley) and LX-R5. Sam Witwer provides the voice of an unknown character of the dark side of the Force during the final challenge of each episode.

Documentaries

Disney Gallery: The Mandalorian (2020–present) 

A making-of documentary series about The Mandalorian debuted on Disney+ with an eight-episode season on May 4, 2020. A second season was split into two longer episodes.

Vehicle Flythroughs (2021) 
Vehicle Flythroughs is a Disney+ series of tours through vehicles, with one episode for the Millennium Falcon and one for a First Order Star Destroyer. It was released on May 4, 2021, along with a Biomes short film.

Galaxy of Sounds (2021) 
Galaxy of Sounds is a Disney+ series of seven short compilations focusing on the sound effects from various Star Wars films, grouped into thematic episodes.

Disney Gallery: The Book of Boba Fett (2022) 

A making-of documentary series about The Book of Boba Fett debuted on Disney+ with a single hour-long episode in May 2022.

Reception

Ratings

Critical response

Emmy Awards

Abandoned projects

Underworld
In 2005, plans for a live-action television series set between the prequel and original trilogies were announced at Star Wars Celebration. In 2007, Lucas described the project as "one show that will split into four shows, focusing on different characters." It entered development in early 2009. The series was described as "gritty and dark" and was expected to feature characters such as Han Solo, Chewbacca, Lando Calrissian, Boba Fett, C-3PO, and Emperor Palpatine. Lucas described the series as "more talky. It's more of what I would call a soap opera with a bunch of personal dramas in it. It's not really based on action-adventure films from the '30s—it's actually more based on film noir movies from the '40s!" Producer Rick McCallum revealed the working title, Star Wars: Underworld, in 2012, and that it would focus on criminal and political power struggles in the "period when the Empire is trying to take things over."

Over one hundred 42-minute episodes were planned, with 50 scripts written. These were mostly second drafts, but due to their complex content, were too expensive to produce. Ronald D. Moore was one of the writers, and extensive artwork including character, costume, and set designs were developed at Skywalker Ranch under the close supervision of Lucas and McCallum. The project was still being considered after Lucasfilm was sold to Disney, including by ABC, with stories being reviewed . According to Kathleen Kennedy,

The plot of the anthology film Rogue One was originally pitched as an episode of the series. The story of Han winning the Millennium Falcon from Lando was planned to be featured and later developed as Solo: A Star Wars Story. The planet Daiyu portrayed in Obi-Wan Kenobi is similar to the atmosphere of level 1313 of Coruscant which George Lucas wanted to show. Boba Fett was also reported to appear in the show; Star Wars author, Karen Traviss, was to write a novel involving Boba Fett, but the project was reportedly canceled because of possible conflicts with the TV series. In early 2020, Stargate Studios shared test footage made to promote the series to networks, as well as a Google Doc listing production details for the series.

Detours

Star Wars Detours is an unaired animated parody series from the creators of Robot Chicken, which was postponed in 2013 and ultimately unaired. Production began in 2012 prior to the Disney acquisition, with 39 episodes completed and 62 additional scripts finished.

Rangers of the New Republic 

In December 2020, Rangers of the New Republic was announced. Developed by Favreau and Filoni, it was planned to tie into The Mandalorian, The Book of Boba Fett and Ahsoka. Variety reported in May 2021 that the series was not in active development. In an interview with Empire published in November 2021, Kathleen Kennedy said development had not reached a point where scripts were written and that she felt some of the ideas for the series would "figure into future episodes ... of the next iteration of Mandalorian". Empire cited Gina Carano's departure from Lucasfilm as a possible reason for the halting of the series, implying that her character, Cara Dune, was intended to star in it. A Mandalorian spin-off series centered on Dune had been rumored by late 2020, but after Carano posted controversial social media statements in November 2020 and February 2021, Disney severed ties with the actress.

See also
 List of Star Wars films
 Lego Star Wars § Films and videos
 List of Star Wars cast members
 List of Star Wars characters

Notes

References

External links
 

Star Wars
Television series